Candelaria (Candelaria / Palacio Legislativo in some of the Line 4 signage) is a Mexico City Metro rail station. It is located in Venustiano Carranza municipality east of downtown Mexico City. It lies along Lines 1 and 4. Starting 11 July 2022, the Line 1 station will remain closed for at least eight months for modernization work on the tunnel and the line's technical equipment.

Name and iconography
The station logo depicts a swimming duck. Its name and logo come from the surrounding neighbourhood of La Candelaria de los Patos (the Spanish word pato means "duck") where, only a few decades ago, many duck species lived and were bred and sold in a local market.

General information
Metro Candelaria has a subsidiary name, Metro Palacio Legislativo ("Legislative Palace"), because of its proximity to the Palacio Legislativo de San Lázaro used by the Chamber of Deputies (Cámara de diputados), the lower house of the Mexican Congress.

Candelaria is a transfer station, with Line 1 running underground and Line 4 on an elevated surface viaduct. The station features an in-corridor cultural display. The Line 1 platform for the station was opened on 5 September 1969, and the Line 4 platform was opened on 29 August 1981. Service from Candeleria to Santa Anita started on 25 May 1982.

This station has the only "Lost and Found" office in the entire Metro system. It displays the architecture of Félix Candela, who designed the Candelaria station and many buildings in Mexico, such as the San Lázaro metro station and the Palacio de los Deportes, which served as a venue during the 1968 Summer Olympics.

Nearby
Palacio Legislativo de San Lázaro, main seat of the legislative power of the Mexican government.

Exits

Line 1
North: Avenida Candelaria de los Patos, Candelaria de los Patos
South: Avenida Candelaria de los Patos, Candelaria de los Patos

Line 4
East: Avenida Congreso de la Unión and Sidar y Rovirosa street, Colonia El Parque
West: Avenida Congreso de la Unión and General Anaya street, Candelaria de los Patos

Ridership

Gallery

References

External links 
 

Candelaria
Railway stations opened in 1969
1969 establishments in Mexico
Félix Candela buildings
Railway stations opened in 1981
1981 establishments in Mexico
Mexico City Metro Line 4 stations
Mexico City Metro stations in Venustiano Carranza, Mexico City